Agnes of Waiblingen (1072/73 – 24 September 1143), also known as Agnes of Germany, Agnes of Poitou and Agnes of Saarbrücken, was a member of the Salian imperial family.  Through her first marriage, she was Duchess of Swabia; through her second marriage, she was Margravine of Austria.

Family 
She was the daughter of Henry IV, Holy Roman Emperor, and Bertha of Savoy.

First marriage
In 1079, aged seven, Agnes was betrothed to Frederick, a member of the Hohenstaufen dynasty; at the same time, Henry IV invested Frederick as the new duke of Swabia. The couple married in 1086, when Agnes was fourteen. They had twelve children, eleven of whom were named in a document found in the abbey of Lorsch:
 Hedwig-Eilike (1088–1110), married Friedrich, Count of Legenfeld  
 Bertha-Bertrade (1089–1120), married Adalbert, Count of Elchingen
 Frederick II of Swabia
 Hildegard
 Conrad III of Germany
 Gisihild-Gisela
 Heinrich (1096–1105)
 Beatrix (1098–1130), became an abbess
 Kunigunde-Cuniza (1100–1120/1126), wife of Henry X, Duke of Bavaria (1108–1139)
 Sophia, married Konrad II, Count of Pfitzingen
 Fides-Gertrude, married Hermann III, Count Palatine of the Rhine
 Richildis, married Hugh I, Count of Roucy

Second marriage
Following Frederick's death in 1105, Agnes married Leopold III (1073–1136), the Margrave of Austria (1095–1136). According to a legend, a veil lost by Agnes and found by Leopold years later while hunting was the instigation for him to found the Klosterneuburg Monastery.

Their children were:
 Adalbert
 Leopold IV
 Henry II of Austria
 Berta, married Heinrich of Regensburg 
 Agnes, "one of the most famous beauties of her time", married Wladyslaw II of Poland
 Ernst
 Uta, wife of Liutpold von Plain
 Otto of Freising, bishop and biographer 
 Conrad, Bishop of Passau, and Archbishop of Salzburg
 Elisabeth, married Hermann, Count of Winzenburg
 Judith, m. c. 1133 William V of Montferrat. Their children formed an important Crusading dynasty.
 Gertrude, married Vladislav II of Bohemia

According to the Continuation of the Chronicles of Klosterneuburg, there may have been up to seven other children (possibly from multiple births) stillborn or who died in infancy.

In 2013, documentation regarding the results of DNA testing of the remains of the family buried in Klosterneuburg Abbey strongly favor that Adalbert was the son of Leopold and Agnes.

In 1125, Agnes' brother, Henry V, Holy Roman Emperor, died childless, leaving Agnes and her children as heirs to the Salian dynasty's immense allodial estates, including Waiblingen.

In 1127, Agnes' second son, Konrad III, was elected as the rival King of Germany by those opposed to the Saxon party's Lothar III. When Lothar died in 1137, Konrad was elected to the position.

References

Sources

 Karl Lechner, Die Babenberger, 1992.
 Brigitte Vacha & Walter Pohl, Die Welt der Babenberger: Schleier, Kreuz und Schwert, Graz, 1995.
Ancestral Roots of Certain American Colonists Who Came to America Before 1700 by Frederick Lewis Weis, Line 45-24
I.S. Robsinson, Henry IV of Germany, 1056-1106 (Cambridge 2003).
H. Decker-Hauff, Die Zeit der Staufer, vol. III (Stuttgart, 1977).

1070s births
1143 deaths
Year of birth uncertain
Austrian royal consorts
Duchesses of Swabia
Hohenstaufen
Babenberg
Salian dynasty
Daughters of emperors
Daughters of kings
Remarried royal consorts